Aerotolerant anaerobes use fermentation to produce ATP. They do not use oxygen, but they can protect themselves from reactive oxygen molecules. In contrast, obligate anaerobes can be harmed by reactive oxygen molecules.

There are three categories of anaerobes. Where obligate aerobes require oxygen to grow, obligate anaerobes are damaged by oxygen, aerotolerant organisms cannot use oxygen but tolerate its presence, and facultative anaerobes use oxygen if it is present but can grow without it.

Most aerotolerant anaerobes have superoxide dismutase and (non-catalase) peroxidase but don't have catalase. More specifically, they may use a NADH oxidase/NADH peroxidase (NOX/NPR) system or a glutathione peroxidase system. An example of an aerotolerant anaerobe is Cutibacterium acnes.

References 

Microbiology